is a Canadian-Japanese former professional ice hockey goaltender

Career
Imoo was born in New Westminster, British Columbia. He played in the Western Hockey League for the New Westminster Bruins, Lethbridge Hurricanes and Regina Pats between 1987 and 1991. In his first professional season, the 1991–92 season, Imoo played for four different teams; the East Coast Hockey League's Cincinnati Cyclones, Erie Panthers and Dayton Bombers as well as the International Hockey League's Fort Wayne Komets.

Imoo would then go to Japan to play in the Japan Ice Hockey League for Seibu Tetsudo. He remained with the team until 2003 when he signed for the Oji Eagles. Imoo also played for the Japan national team, playing in three Ice Hockey World Championships as well as in the men's tournament at the 1998 Winter Olympics.

After retiring in 2006, Imoo returned to Canada, becoming a goaltending consultant for the Surrey Eagles of the British Columbia Hockey League. He later became the goaltending coach for the WHL's Seattle Thunderbirds and the St. John's Ice Caps of the American Hockey League before becoming the goaltending coach of the Los Angeles Kings of the National Hockey League in 2015. In 2019, Imoo became the goaltending coach of the KHL's Kunlun Red Star. In 2021, Imoo was hired as goalie coach of the Toronto Marlies. He was let go shortly after transphobic likes and retweets of his were found on his Twitter account.

References

External links
 

1970 births
Living people
Canadian expatriate ice hockey players in the United States
Canadian ice hockey coaches
Canadian ice hockey goaltenders
Canadian sportspeople of Japanese descent
Cincinnati Cyclones (ECHL) players
Dayton Bombers players
Erie Panthers players
Fort Wayne Komets players
Ice hockey people from British Columbia
Ice hockey players at the 1998 Winter Olympics
Japanese ice hockey goaltenders
Kelowna Spartans players
Lethbridge Hurricanes players
Los Angeles Kings coaches
New Westminster Bruins players
Oji Eagles players
Olympic ice hockey players of Japan
Regina Pats players
Sportspeople from New Westminster